Testis-specific serine/threonine-protein kinase 2 is an enzyme that in humans is encoded by the TSSK2 gene.

References

Further reading 

 
 
 
 
 

EC 2.7.11